Abdullah Al-Waked Al-Shahrani (born 29 September 1975) is a Saudi Arabian football player.

He played most of his career for Al Shabab and Al Ittihad and is playing now with Al-Nasr.

He played for the Saudi Arabia national football team and was a participant at the 2002 FIFA World Cup. He participated in the 1996 Summer Olympics.

Honours

International
Saudi Arabia
Islamic Solidarity Games: 2005

References

External links

1975 births
Living people
Saudi Arabian footballers
Saudi Arabia international footballers
1999 FIFA Confederations Cup players
2002 FIFA World Cup players
2000 AFC Asian Cup players
Footballers at the 1996 Summer Olympics
Olympic footballers of Saudi Arabia
Ittihad FC players
Al-Shabab FC (Riyadh) players
Al-Ahli Saudi FC players
Al Nassr FC players
Association football midfielders
Saudi Professional League players